O. rubra  may refer to:
 Olivella rubra, the dwarf olive, a small sea snail species
 Oxalis rubra, the red woodsorrel or windowbox woodsorrel, a flowering plant species

See also
 Rubra (disambiguation)